Mae Tam, Phayao is a subdistrict (tambon) of Mueang Phayao District, in Phayao Province, Thailand. As of 2010, it has a population of 7,841 people. Together with Wiang subdistrict it forms the town Phayao.

References

External links
ThaiTambon.com on Mae Tam (Thai)

Tambon of Phayao province
Populated places in Phayao province